Makka may refer to:

 Makka, city and administrative center of the Mecca Province of Saudi Arabia, and the holiest city in Islam
 Ioulia Makka, Greek Woman International Master
 Fidelis Makka, Military Governor of Benue State

See also 

 Macca (disambiguation)